Ostenau (Danish: Øster Å) is a river of Schleswig-Holstein, Germany. It flows into the Arlau near Almdorf.

See also
List of rivers of Schleswig-Holstein

Rivers of Schleswig-Holstein
1Ostenau
Rivers of Germany